"White Winter Hymnal" is the first single from Fleet Foxes' debut 2008 self-titled album. Released by European label Bella Union on July 21, 2008, the single was issued on 7" vinyl as well as digital MP3 format. The B-side is the non-album track "Isles".

Track listing
All songs written by Robin Pecknold.
"White Winter Hymnal" – 2:27
"Isles" – 3:06

Critical reception
Time critic Josh Tyrangiel named this the #5 song of 2008. Pitchfork Media ranked it the #2 song of 2008 and #66 on their decade end list.

Covers and use in media
This song was covered by ARORA on the album Sonosings (2009) and by Birdy on her debut album Birdy (2011).

In 2010, the song was parodied by The Fringemunks to recap Fringe episode 2.20, "Northwest Passage".

It was also covered by Kina Grannis on her album Stairwells (2011).

British vocalist Kim Wilde released a version on her 2013 Christmas album Wilde Winter Songbook, performed with her father Marty Wilde and brother Ricky Wilde.

In 2014 it was also covered by acappella group Pentatonix on their album That's Christmas to Me.

In the eighth season of X Factor (Danish TV series), it was covered by group Ivarsson, Bang & Neumann.

It is used as the opening song to the Hulu series, The Path.

Phish performed an a cappella version as part of their 2017 “Baker’s Dozen” residency at Madison Square Garden.

It is on the soundtrack for the 2015 movie Love the Coopers.

In 2017 British television presenter and singer Alexander Armstrong covered the song on his Christmas album, In a Winter Light.

In 2021, this song was used for the Spanish Christmas Lottery commercial.

Certifications

References

External links
"White Winter Hymnal" music video on YouTube

2008 debut singles
2008 songs
Animated music videos
Fleet Foxes songs
Stop-motion animated music videos